San Miguel de Urcuquí Canton, or Urkuki,  is a canton of Ecuador, located in the Imbabura Province. Its seat is the town of Urcuquí. Its population in the 2001 census was 14,381 and was 15,671 in the 2010 census.

San Miguel de Urcuquí is located in the Andes of northern Ecuador.

Demographics
Ethnic groups as of the Ecuadorian census of 2010:
Mestizo  83.1% 
Afro-Ecuadorian  9.3%
Indigenous  5.5%
White  1.9%
Montubio  0.2%
Other  0.1%

References

Cantons of Imbabura Province